The Berkeley Buddhist Monastery is a Chan Buddhist monastery in Berkeley, California affiliated with the City of Ten Thousand Buddhas and led by Heng Sure. It is the site of the Institute for World Religions, founded by Hsuan Hua.

The Monastery opened in 1994. It is located in a building which was once a Nazarene church. The monastery holds public lectures, meditation sessions, meditation classes, and daily ceremonies, in English and Chinese, and occasionally in Vietnamese. The abbot Heng Sure, is a supporter of vegetarianism and of the use of the English language and Western musical styles in Buddhist liturgy.

References

1994 establishments in California
Buddhist monasteries in the United States
Chan temples
Chinese-American culture in California
Buddhism in the San Francisco Bay Area
Buddhist temples in Berkeley